Zhou Keqin (1937 – August 5, 1990) was a Chinese writer regarded as a representative of Scar literature. Born in Jianyang, Sichuan, he is famous in China for the 1979 novel Xu Mao and His Daughters, which was made into a movie in 1981 and which also won him the first-time Mao Dun Literature Prize, a prestigious literary award.

Biography 
Zhou graduated from Chengdu Agricultural Technology School in 1958 and then became a farmer in his hometown. He published his first work, At the Well, in 1963. Afterwards, he published many short stories in newspapers. In 1979, he completed the novel Xu Mao and His Daughters, about 200,000 characters in length, which, in realistic style, depicted the life of a farmer's family in a desolate village and reflected the impacts of many rural policies on the family. Zhou became a renowned writer nationwide in China for this novel and he was considered one of the leading figures in Scar Literature.

Zhou became the vice chairman of the Sichuan Writers Association in 1984 and he later served as a member of Chinese Writers Association 4th Council.

Death 
He died on August 5, 1990, in Chengdu, at age of 53.

References

1937 births
1990 deaths
Chinese male short story writers
Writers from Chengdu
20th-century novelists
Mao Dun Literature Prize laureates
Chinese male novelists
20th-century Chinese short story writers
20th-century Chinese male writers
People's Republic of China short story writers
Short story writers from Sichuan